THB is a creator-owned comic book series by Paul Pope.

Publication history
Pope self-published issue #1 of THB in 1994 through his own Horse Press — during a new wave of black-and-white independent comic books that included Bone, Hepcats, and Starchild.

Pope has sporadically published THB  issues and short stories since its 1994 debut. The comics can be divided into two general categories: 

 The main THB storyline (currently standing at 11 issues) 
 Multiple short stories and short-story collections

THB main storyline to date 

Pope has said he plans to conclude the series' main storyline. In 2007, it was announced that the complete series would be published as Total THB—a multi-volume, full-color collection—by First Second Books.

THB short stories and short-story collections

Plot
A sci-fi story set on a future colonized Mars, THB chronicles the adventures of teenage girl HR Watson and THB, her super-powered bodyguard.

THB is a "Super-Mek" whose name stands for "Tri-Hydro Bi-oxygenate," a fictional molecule created by Pope. When un-activated, THB resembles a small rubber ball carried around by HR Watson; when activated with water, THB expands to take the form of a purple, seven-foot (215 cm) tall, super-powered humanoid resembling a genie.

HR is the daughter of wealthy robot manufacturer Clovis Watson, and lives with him in Velo City while attending classes at the Academy of Advanced Disciplines. 

In the series' main storyline, HR's father makes plans to move his business outside the taxable boundaries of V-City and mine the asteroid belt, assisted by his bodyguard and right-hand man Mister McHaine. This attracts the attention of the ruling Buranchist Party, or "Bugfaces." The Bugfaces attempt to take HR in for questioning by sending a series of robot agents to capture her; one robot agent is delivered to her home disguised as a Steinway piano. 

Following a series of wild chases, HR flees with THB across the desert to Plutonium City — hiding out with her older step-brother Percy and members of a popular musical group, the Complex Passions. She continues to evade capture while falling for the band's lead clarinetist, The Jiggler. She is assisted from afar by her best friend Lollie Perducci, daughter of a famous opera singer, and Lollie's intelligent pet Mister Pig-Dog.

Pope has also written and drawn numerous THB short stories, many of them chronicling the comic misadventures of HR and Lollie, as well as stand-alone tales featuring one-off characters set in other parts of the THB universe.

Awards
 1995: Nominated for "Best New Series" Eisner Award

Notes

References

External links
Official THB website
THB page at PaulPope.com
Bibliography of all THB material published 1995-2003 
2010 interview with Paul Pope featuring discussion of THB
Comics Kayfabe video breakdown of THB 1.v.2